A log is a biblical and halakhic unit of liquid volume.  
The word log occurs in the Bible, in  Lev. 14:10, 15, 21 which prescribes the korban (asham, "guilt-offering") of a poor  metzorah:

And if he be poor, and his means suffice not, then he shall take one he-lamb for a guilt-offering to be waved, to make atonement for him, and one tenth part of an ephah of fine flour mingled with oil for a meal-offering, and a log of oil;

Unit definition, conversion, mnemonics and supports
The Talmud, citing the gematria of an extra scriptural word ZeH "this," which equals twelve (seven plus five), explains that one hin is twelve log:

:
The Gemara elaborates: Now, one hin is twelve log, as it is written: “And of olive oil a hin” (Exodus 30:24), and it is written afterward in the same verse: “Sacred anointing oil, this [zeh] shall be for Me, throughout your generations.” The numerical value [gematria] of zeh is twelve.

The Mishnah immediately preceding, which this Gemara comes to explain, states that a half-hin is six log.  Thus a hin is twelve log.

A list of conversions follows:
 1 hin =  12 logs
 1 log =  6 Beitzah (egg)

See also
 Biblical and Talmudic units of measurement

References

Units of volume
Obsolete units of measurement